The Secretary of State of the Navy was one of the four or five specialised secretaries of state in France during the Ancien Régime. This officeholder was responsible for the French Navy and for all of the French colonies. In 1791, at the end of the French Monarchy during the French Revolution, this title was changed to Minister of the Navy.

List of secretaries

See also
 List of naval ministers of France
 Ancien Régime
 Early modern France

 Navy